Valtter Virtanen (born 4 June 1987) is a Finnish figure skater. He is a three-time Nordic medalist (gold in 2022, silver in 2016, bronze in 2014) and a six-time Finnish national champion (2013, 2015–2018, 2022). He has competed at a total of sixteen ISU Championships, reaching the final segment on six occasions, at five European and one World Junior Championships. His best ISU Championship placement, 14th, came at the 2023 Europeans in Espoo.

Personal life 
Virtanen was born on 4 June 1987 in Kerava, Finland. After completing his studies in late 2015, he became a medical doctor at a hospital in Oberstdorf, Germany. He works part-time in the emergency room of the hospital of Peurunka in Finland. 

He married German figure skater Alina Mayer in July 2016. The couple have a daughter, born in January 2021.

Career 
Virtanen began skating in 1992 at Keravan Luistinseura. A competitor at three consecutive World Junior Championships, he reached the final segment and finished 20th overall at the 2005 Junior Worlds in Kitchener, Ontario, Canada.

He has competed at a total of four World Championships and nine European Championships. He achieved his career-best continental result, 14th, at the 2023 European Championships in Espoo, Finland.

Programs

Results
GP: Grand Prix; CS: Challenger Series; JGP: Junior Grand Prix

2010–2011 to present

2002–2003 to 2009–2010

References

External links

 

1987 births
Living people
People from Kerava
Finnish male single skaters
Competitors at the 2015 Winter Universiade
Competitors at the 2009 Winter Universiade
Sportspeople from Uusimaa